Cao Huiying (born 1954 in Luannan County) is a Chinese former volleyball player. She was a member of the Chinese national team that won gold at both the 1981 FIVB Women's World Cup and the 1982 FIVB Women's World Championship. She also won a gold medal at the 1982 Asian Games, after which she retired.

She was Team China's first ever captain. She played for China with tuberculosis, a knee injury, and only seven healthy fingers.

Individual awards 
Best blocker, 1977 FIVB Volleyball Women's World Cup
Spirit of fight, 1977 FIVB Volleyball Women's World Cup

References

1954 births
Volleyball players from Hebei
People from Luannan County
Sportspeople from Tangshan
Living people
Chinese women's volleyball players
Asian Games medalists in volleyball
Volleyball players at the 1982 Asian Games
Medalists at the 1982 Asian Games
Asian Games gold medalists for China